DZBB may refer to one of the following GMA Network owned broadcasters:

DZBB-AM, a radio station (594 AM) in Metro Manila
DZBB-TV, a television station (channel 7 analog) in Metro Manila